David Reed (born August 21, 1988, in Teaneck, New Jersey) is an American soccer player who is currently without a club.

Career

College and amateur
From Teaneck, New Jersey, Reed attended Paramus Catholic High School, and played four years of college soccer at Johns University. He played 84 games in his college career at St. John's without scoring a goal; as a senior in 2009 he anchored the defense that registered a school-record and nation-leading 16 shutouts.

During his college years Reed also played extensively in the national amateur leagues, playing for the Long Island Rough Riders in the USL Premier Development League in 2008 and  2009, and in the National Premier Soccer League for New York Red Bull NPSL in 2010.

Professional
Reed signed his first professional contract in 2011 when he was signed by F.C. New York of the USL Professional Division. He made his professional debut on May 7, 2011 in a 1–1 tie with the Harrisburg City Islanders.

References

1988 births
Living people
American soccer players
St. John's Red Storm men's soccer players
Kalamazoo Outrage players
Long Island Rough Riders players
F.C. New York players
USL League Two players
USL Championship players
People from Teaneck, New Jersey
Soccer players from New Jersey
Sportspeople from Bergen County, New Jersey
Association football defenders
Paramus Catholic High School alumni